Gass is a surname. Notable people with this surname include:
 A. J. Gass (born 1975), Canadian football player
 Alison Gass, American curator and museum director
 Bob Gass, American-based Irish Christian pastor, broadcaster and author
 Charles George Gass (1898–1977), Royal Air Force officer, gunner ace in World War I
 Craig Gass (born 1970), American actor, comedian, and impressionist
 Daniela Gass (born 1980), German racing cyclist
 Elizabeth Gass, Lady Gass (born 1940), Lord Lieutenant of Somerset, England
 Floyd Gass (1927–2006), American football and basketball player, coach, and college athletics administrator
 Glenn Gass (born 1956), American educator
 Ian Graham Gass (1926–1992), British geologist, Professor of Earth Sciences at the Open University
 Jack Gass, 19th century American football player
 John Bradshaw Gass (1855–1939), British architect and artist
 John Donald MacIntyre Gass (1928–2005), Canadian-American ophthalmologist
 Karl Gass (1917–2009), German documentary filmmaker
 Kyle Gass (born 1960), American rock musician, singer-songwriter and actor
 Melbourne Gass (born 1938), Canadian businessman and former politician
 Michael Gass (1916–1983), British colonial administrator
 Michelle Gass, American businesswoman
 Nabo Gass (born 1954), German painter and glass artist
 Neville Gass (1893–1965), British businessman, chairman of BP, 1957-1960
 Octavius D. Gass (1824–1924), American prospector and rancher
 Patrick Gass (1771–1870), U.S. Army sergeant, member of the Lewis and Clark Expedition
 Robert Gass (born 1948), American musician, member of the bands Bead Game and the Freedom Express
 Simon Gass (born 1956), British diplomat
 Thomas Gass (born 1963), Swiss scientist and economist, United Nations Assistant Secretary-General for Policy Coordination and Inter-Agency Affairs
 Wilhelm Gass (1813–1889), German theologian
 William H. Gass (1924–2017), American novelist, short story writer, essayist, critic, philosophy professor

As pseudonym 
Bobby Gass, as used by Bobby Tench, British vocalist and guitarist